The 1994 Kingston upon Thames Council election took place on 5 May 1994 to elect members of Kingston upon Thames London Borough Council in London, England. The whole council was up for election and the Liberal Democrats gained overall control of the council.

Background

Election result

Ward results

References

1994
1994 London Borough council elections